Shri Vaishnav Vidyapeeth Vishwavidyalaya is a private university established under Madhya Pradesh Niji Vishwavidyalaya (Sthapana Avam Sanchalan) Adhiniyam in 2015 at Indore MP(India).

See also
Indore University (Governing/Parent University)
Rajiv Gandhi Technical University
Indore (hosting city)
Engineering

References

External links 
 http://www.svits.ac.in
 http://www.svvv.edu.in

Universities and colleges in Indore
Engineering colleges in Madhya Pradesh
Science and technology in Indore
Educational institutions established in 1995
1995 establishments in Madhya Pradesh